Coron can refer to:

Places
 Coron, Palawan, a municipality in the Philippines
 Coron Island, under the jurisdiction of the municipality, Philippines
 Coron, Maine-et-Loire, a commune in the Maine-et-Loire département in France
 Coron, the Venetian name of the coastal town of Koroni on the Ionian Sea, in present-day Greece.
 Siege of Coron

People
 Jean-Michel Coron (born 1956), a French mathematician
 Coron D. Evans (born 1844), an American soldier

Other
 (urbanism) Coron, a historical type of working-class housing found in parts of Northern France and Belgium
 Coron Land, a 1995 action video game
 Llywelyn's coronet (Coron Arthur)
 "Les corons", French miner's song